Karl Hoffmann (10 October 1935 – 16 March 2020) was a German footballer who played as a midfielder. He competed for West Germany in the men's tournament at the 1956 Summer Olympics.

References

External links
 

1935 births
2020 deaths
Footballers from Düsseldorf
German footballers
Association football midfielders
Olympic footballers of the United Team of Germany
Footballers at the 1956 Summer Olympics
Fortuna Düsseldorf players
20th-century German people